Mark Biondich is a Canadian historian specializing in Southeast Europe, especially former Yugoslavia, with an emphasis on nationalism. He holds a Ph.D. from the University of Toronto. In 1999–2000 he conducted research at the USHMM.

Works

References

21st-century Canadian historians
University of Toronto alumni
Historians of the Holocaust
Historians of the Balkans